The Klaserie River is a river in Limpopo Province, South Africa. It flows northeastwards and is a tributary of the Olifants River, joining it at 90° in the west of the Kruger National Park.

Dam
 Jan Wassenaar Dam

See also
 List of rivers of South Africa

External links
 Google map of Klaserie River's se mouth at Geonames.org (cc-by)

Olifants River (Limpopo)
Rivers of Limpopo